Kammerforst in the Kannenbäckerland is an Ortsgemeinde – a community belonging to a Verbandsgemeinde – in the Westerwaldkreis in Rhineland-Palatinate, Germany.

Geography

The community lies roughly 13 km northeast of Koblenz on the edge of the Nassau Nature Park. The community belongs to the Verbandsgemeinde of Höhr-Grenzhausen, a kind of collective municipality. Its seat is in the like-named town.

History
The community came into being sometime about the year 1680. It was founded by Walloon guest workers who were seeking iron ore in the area.

Politics

The municipal council is made up of 7 council members, including the extraofficial mayor (Bürgermeister), who were elected in a municipal election on 13 June 2004.

Economy and infrastructure

The A 48 with its Höhr-Grenzhausen interchange is 4 km away. The nearest InterCityExpress stop is the railway station at Montabaur on the Cologne-Frankfurt high-speed rail line or the one at Koblenz on the Rechte Rheinstrecke.

References

External links
 Kammerforst 

Municipalities in Rhineland-Palatinate
Westerwaldkreis